The shift rule is a mathematical rule for sequences and series.

For sequences, the rule states that if  is a sequence, then it converges if and only if  also converges, and in this case both sequences always converge to the same number.

For series, the rule states that the series  converges to a number if and only if  converges.

References

Sequences and series